Fábio Alexandre Martins Sapateiro (born 18 August 1990 in Arrentela, Setúbal District) is a Portuguese footballer who plays as a goalkeeper.

External links

 

1990 births
Living people
Portuguese footballers
Association football goalkeepers
Liga Portugal 2 players
Segunda Divisão players
Portimonense S.C. players
Sportspeople from Setúbal District